Þórbjǫrn Hornklofi (Modern Norwegian: Torbjørn Hornklove) was a 9th-century Norwegian skald and one of the court poet of King Harald Fairhair. His poetry has sometimes been regarded as a contemporary source of information regarding King Harald, although it is only preserved embedded within 13th and 14th century king's sagas.

A portion of two skaldic poems by him which are preserved are Hrafnsmál and Glymdrápa. The first poem, which utilizes verse form málaháttr, describes life at Harald's court, mentions that he took a Danish wife, and that he won a victory at the Battle of Hafrsfjord. The second is a drápa which relates a series of battles Harald won during the consolidation of his rule of Norway.

Translations
 Kershaw, Nora (1922) Anglo-Saxon and Norse Poems (originally published by The University Press, 1922. re-published by Kessinger Publishing, LLC . 2009) 
 Hollander, Lee Milton (1980) Old Norse Poems: The Most Important Nonskaldic Verse Not Included in the Poetic Edda  (originally printed by Columbia University Press. 1936, re-published by Abela Publishing. 2010)

References

External links
The Lay of Harold (Translation and commentary by Lee M. Hollander)
Den norsk-islandske skjaldedigtning (Author: Finnur Jónsson)

Thorbjorn horklof
Thorbjorn horklof